Scott Alan Sandelin (born August 8, 1964) is an American former professional ice hockey player. He is currently the head coach of the Minnesota-Duluth Bulldogs men's ice hockey team. In 2011, he became the first coach in Bulldog history to lead them to a national title, in a 3–2 overtime game against the University of Michigan at the Xcel Energy Center in Saint Paul, Minnesota. In the 2018 NCAAs, he led the Bulldogs to a second national title, over Notre Dame 2–1, also played at the Xcel Energy Center. The following season, in the 2019 NCAAs, he led the Bulldogs to a third national title. Sandelin grew up in Hibbing, Minnesota, where he went on to be drafted in the second round by the Montreal Canadiens (40th overall) and play collegiate hockey for the North Dakota Fighting Sioux.

Collegiate career 
During his senior year at North Dakota, Sandelin was chosen as a finalist for the Hobey Baker Award, ALL-WCHA First Team, All American Second Team, and the MVP of the Fighting Sioux.

Professional career 
Sandelin's NHL career totaled seven seasons with the Canadiens (1986–88), Philadelphia Flyers (1990–91), and his home state team, the Minnesota North Stars (1991–92). His career was cut short with continuous injuries, but he managed four assists in 25 games. His playing years also included stints with the US World Junior Championship team in 1984 and World Championships in 1986.

Coaching 
Sandelin started his coaching career with the Fargo-Moorhead Junior Kings of the Junior Elite Hockey League, which he was with from 1993 to 1994. From there he went to work on the North Dakota staff from 1994 to 2000. The first three as a recruiter and assisting with games and practices. The last three were spent as an associate head coach to Dean Blais, now with the Nebraska-Omaha Mavericks. In his years with Fighting Sioux, they went on to make four NCAA from (1996 to 2000), win two National Champions in (1996–97 and 1999–2000), three WCHA regular season champions from (1996–99) and two WCHA conference tournament champions in (1996–97 and 1999–2000).

Minnesota-Duluth 
On March 30, 2000, Sandelin accepted the job as the head coach of the University of Minneasota-Duluth Bulldogs for long time Bulldog coach Mike Sertich. As head coach he has led the Bulldogs to six 22+ win seasons, eight NCAA tournament appearances (2003–04, 2008–09, 2010–2012, 2015–2019). In 2008–09, he knocked off his former North Dakota team to become the WCHA Final Five Champions. Then in 2010–2011 the Bulldogs made a run in the NCAA tournament to become the 2011 NCAA Champions, beating Yale, Union, Notre Dame and Michigan for the title. He made the Bulldogs the second Division I collegiate team in Minnesota to take home the Frozen Four Title, after the Minnesota Golden Gophers. In 2003–04, he was named the WCHA Coach of the year and the National Coach of the year posting a 28–13–4 record and leading the Bulldogs to a third-place finish in the Frozen Four. He has also produced two Hobey Baker winners in Junior Lessard in 2004 and Jack Connolly in 2012, along with 15 future NHL hockey players and 17 All WCHA selections. During the stretch he was the US National Junior coach in 2005 and assistant coach in 2012. In the 2011–12 season he led the Bulldogs to a 17-game unbeaten streak, and the first time in Bulldog history at the number one in the USCHO polls for 9 straight weeks. In 2016, he signed a 4-year extension, keeping him under contract until the 2020–2021 season.

He led the 2017 Bulldogs to an NCHC conference tournament championship, the season ended in 3–2 loss to conference foe Denver as NCAA Runner up. In 2018 he led the Bulldogs to a 2nd National Title beating Notre Dame 2–1. The Bulldogs made the 2018 NCAA Hockey Tournament by 0.0001% besting in state rival Minnesota for the last at-large tournament bid. Scott's 2nd National championship as head coach in 2018 was unexpected by many in the hockey community after losing to Denver in the 2017 title game, losing many key players to graduation and early departures to the NHL. Each time the NCAA Frozen Four has been held at the Xcel Energy Center in Saint Paul, a Minnesota team has won in overtime, University of Minnesota in (2001–02) beating the University of Maine 4–3 and the Bulldogs in (2010–11) against the University of Michigan 3–2, and again in 2017-2018 beating Notre Dame 2–1. 

Sandelin led the 2018-19 Bulldogs to an NCHC conference championship, besting St. Cloud 3–2 in a 2 OT game. The Bulldog's earned a trip to the Frozen Four by beating Bowling Green (2-1 OT) and Quinnipiac (3-1). The semifinal match-up with Providence ended in a 4–1 win. The Bulldog's finished the season by beating UMass (3-0) earning Sandelin's third coaching championship.

Sandelin led the 2019-20 Bulldogs to 2nd place in the NCHC regular season, but due to the COVID-19 pandemic the conference and NCAA tournaments were cancelled. His team goes into the next season still the reigning NCAA hockey champions.

Head coaching record

Awards and honors

See also
List of college men's ice hockey coaches with 400 wins

References

External links
 

1964 births
Living people
American men's ice hockey defensemen
Hershey Bears players
Ice hockey coaches from Minnesota
Sportspeople from Hibbing, Minnesota
Kalamazoo Wings (1974–2000) players
Minnesota Duluth Bulldogs men's ice hockey coaches
Minnesota North Stars players
Montreal Canadiens draft picks
Montreal Canadiens players
Philadelphia Flyers players
Sherbrooke Canadiens players
North Dakota Fighting Hawks men's ice hockey players
AHCA Division I men's ice hockey All-Americans
Ice hockey players from Minnesota